The Hoppers (until 1981: Hopper Brothers and Connie) are a multi award-winning Southern Gospel group from North Carolina. They have performed together for several decades and have achieved significant popularity due to widening the playing field in Southern Gospel by incorporating Pop, country, and Rock music into their work.

The Hoppers are a family ensemble which first began performing together in 1957. They appeared at the inauguration ceremony for Ronald Reagan in 1981. They won awards for Mixed Vocal Group at the Southern Gospel Music Awards in 1982 and 1983.

Kim Greene of The Greenes joined the group in 1989 after marrying vocalist and former drummer Dean Hopper the year before. Their first major hit at Christian radio was "Here I Am", in 1990; they would score many further hits, including "Grace Will Always Be Greater”," "Mention My Name”, ”Blame It On Love”, “The Ride”, "Hope”," "I’ve Come Too Far”, “He Didn’t Just Carry the Cross",  "That's Him," and "Yes I Am" and their biggest hit to date "Jerusalem" for which they recorded a live video in 2005 from the city itself. In the 2010's the Hoppers had two mega hits "Yahweh" and "Something's Happening". The Hoppers continue strong in the 2020's with the same line up for the past 30+ years.

Mike Hopper married Denice in 1996, who became the group's pianist. In 1998, their version of "Shoutin' Time" became another one of their biggest hits, and the group performed with Bill and Gloria Gaither. They won several further Southern Gospel Music Awards in following years. In addition member Connie Hopper won the career Marvin Norcross Award in 1998. They also performed on the album Tribute To Dottie Rambo, which was a nominee for "Special Event Album of the Year" at the Dove Awards of 1999.

The group has appeared on the Gaither Homecoming tour frequently, and Claude and Dean Hopper are members of the board of directors of the North Carolina Gospel Music Hall of Fame. Mike Hopper has appeared on the television program Touched by an Angel.

In 2007, the Hoppers signed to the shortly revived Canaan Record Label.  Their release, "The Ride", was originally recorded independently, then re-released on the Canaan label.  January 2009 brought the first recording under the Canaan umbrella titled, "North America, Live!". With distribution under the Spring Hill Music Group label, the Hoppers have released "Something's Happening" in August 2010.

Kim Hopper has released two solo projects, "Imagine" under the Spring Hill Label, and most recently (August 2008) "I Just Wanted You To Know" with Canaan Records.

Group accolades

Favorite Mixed Group Award 1997-98-99-00-01-02-03-05-08-09-10-11-12-13-14-15-16-17
Mixed Vocal Group SGMA 1982-83-98-99-00-01
"Hearts-A-Flame" Mixed Group Award 95-96-97

Connie Favorite Alto Award 1998-99-00-15-16-17-18-19-20-21-22 and the
Prestigious Marvin Norcross Award in 1998
Queen of Gospel Music 83-84 Person of the year 2005
Inducted into Southern Gospel Hall of Fame in 2010

Kim Female Vocalist "Hearts-A-Flame" 95-96-97 
Female Vocalist SGMA 99 Young Artist 
Singing News Soprano 97-98-99-00-01-02-03-04-05-06-07-08-09-10-11-12-13-14-15-16-17-18-19-20-21-22
Female Vocalist Singing News 99-00-01-07-08-09-10-11-12-13-14-15-16-17-18-19-20-21-22
Female Vocalist Voice Diamonds 99

Michael Favorite Musician 2001-2005
Favorite Artist Web Site 2005

Members

Line-ups

Hopper Brothers 2.0 Members

Line-ups

Discography
Hopper Brothers and Connie
"Gospel Favorites" (HopperSing Records, 1962)
"5th Anniversary" (HopperSing Records, 1963)
"The Best of the Hopper Brothers and Connie" (HopperSing Records, 1968)
"Try A Little Kindness" (HopperSingRecords, 1969)
"Just Old Time Christians" (HopperSing Records, 1971)
"The Unseen Hand" (HopperSing Records, 1972)
"Jesus Taught Our Hearts To Sing" (Calvary Records, 1972)
"Our Kind of Gospel" (Calvary Records, 1973)
"Sing For...Impact International" (HopperSing Records, 1973)
"Sing Gospel Classics" (Trail Records, 1974)
"Thank God For The Old Rugged Cross" (Trail Records, 1974)
"Greater Than Before" (Supreme Records, 1974)
"A Live and a Singin" (Trail Records, 1974)
"I'm Going There" (Hymnstone Records, 1974)
"Lord Help Me Bury The Hatchet" (QCA Records, 1975)
"Higher" (QCA Records, 1976)
"A Unique Experience" (QCA Records, 1977)
"Highly Seasoned" (Supreme Records, 1977)
"Collector's Edition" (HopperSing Records, 1977)
"Something Going On" (Supreme Records, 1978)
"Garment of Praise" (Trail Records, 1979)
"Home Grown" (Supreme Records, 1979)
"Live" (Supreme Records, 1980)
"God Will Provide" (Trail Records, 1980)
"Home Is Where The Heart Is" (Supreme Records, 1981)
The Hoppers
"Blessings" (HopperSing Records, 1982)
"Come To The Wedding" (Lifeline Records, 1982)
"Think On The Good Things" (Lifeline Records, 1983)
"Traveling Right" (HopperSing Records, 1984)
"I Know What Lies Ahead" (Lifeline Records, 1984)
"Citizen of Two Worlds" (HopperSing Records, 1985)
"Smoke of the Battle" (HopperSing Records, 1986)
"Whosoever Will" (HopperSing Records, 1987)
"Stand For Jesus" (Sonlite Records, 1987)
"He's Still God Live" (Sonlite Records, 1988)
"On These Grounds" (Sonlite Records, 1990)
"Heavenly Sunrise" (Sonlite Records, 1991)
"Mention My Name" (Sonlite Records, 1993)
"One More Time" (Sonlite Records, 1993)
"Never Thirst Again" (Sonlite, 1994)
"A Christmas Story Live" (Sonlite Records, 1994)
"Anchor to the Power of the Cross'' (Homeland, 1995)
"Timepieces Vol. 1" (Sonlite, 1997)
"40 Years Forever To Be Remembered" (HopperSing Records, 1997)
"Forever Settled" (Homeland, 1997)
"Timepieces Vol. 2" (Sonlite, 1998)
"One Foundation" (Homeland, 1998)
"Joy for the Journey" (Homeland, 1999)
"Shoutin' Time: The Best of the Hoppers" (Homeland, 2000)
"Classics:Live in Greenville" (Homeland, 2000)
"Power" (Spring Hill, 2000)
"Great Joy" (FarmHouse Productions, 2001)
"Steppin' Out" (Spring Hill, 2002)
"Imagine" (Spring Hill, 2003)
"Great Day (Spring Hill, 2003)
"Generations" (Spring Hill, 2005)
"Classic Hits" (Sonlite, 2005)
"The Ride" (Hoppers Music/Canaan Records, 2006/2007)
"I Just Wanted You To Know" (Canaan, 2008)
"North America Live" (Canaan, 2009)
"Unforgettable" (Hoppers Music/Mansion Entertainment, 2009)
"The Best of the Hoppers: from the Gaither Homecoming Series" (Gaither Music Group, 2010)
"Something's Happening" (Hoppers Music/Spring Hill, 2010)
"Hymns: A Classic Collection" (Hoppers Music, 2011)
"Count Me In" (Hoppers Music, 2012)
"Generations/Joy for the Journey: Hymns for the Millennium" (Hoppers Music, 2013) [Re-release of former projects on double CD]
"Kids" (Hoppers Music, 2014)
"Life is Good" (Daywind, 2016)
"Honor the First Families of Gospel music" (Hoppers Music, Gaither Music Group, 2018)
"Anchored - A Collection of New Favorites" (Hoppers Music, 2018)
"Grace" (Hoppers Music, 2019)
"Hope" (Daywind, 2021)
"Believe" (Gaither Music Group, 2022)

References
[ The Hoppers] at Allmusic
Encyclopedia of American Gospel Music
Tollbooth.org

External links
Official Website
http://www.sghistory.com/index.php?n=H.Hoppers Southern Gospel History: The Hoppers

Family musical groups
Musical groups from North Carolina
Southern gospel performers